Abu Qays b. al-Aslat (Arabic: أبو قيس بن الأسلت, d.622) was one of the mukhadram poets in Arabic literature. In other words, he lived before the naissance of Islam and witnessed the first years of it.

Life 
Abu Qays b. al-Aslat spent most of his life before Islam. The name of the poet is not known exactly. On the other hand, it is recorded that his name may be Sayfi, al-Harith or Abdullah. He was one of the leaders of the Aws tribe. It is recorded that he led his tribe in the Battle of Bu'ath. There are some weak narrations which suggest that he became a Muslim before he died. However, the data indicating that the poet died without converting to Islam are considered more accurate. The poet, on the other hand, was probably a pre-Islamic hanif.

References

7th-century Arabic poets
Arab people of Arab descent
6th-century Arabic poets